Kelsey is a Manitoban rural municipality embedded within the province's Northern Region. It consists of several disjoint parts. The largest part is Carrot Valley, located around and southwest of The Pas along the Carrot River, but the communities of Wanless and Cranberry Portage, located further north, are also part of the municipality. It is 867.64 km2 large. Also lying in the area around The Pas is the Opaskwayak Cree Nation Indian reserve.

Communities
 Cranberry Portage
 Freshford
 Grace Lake
 Moostissoostikwan
 Ralls Island
 Rocky Lake
 The Pas (independent Town)
 Umpherville
 Wanless
 Westray

Demographics

According to the 2011 National Household Survey, the population of Kelsey is 2,125. The population density was 2.6 per km2. The racial make up of Kelsey is solely made up of Aboriginals (44.0%); First Nations (23.1%) and Metis (20.7%), and Whites (56.0%). The religious make up of Kelsey is; Christian (74.5%), non-religious (25.5%). Every resident of Kelsey is a Canadian citizen. About 4.0% of the population can speak a language that is not recognized as an official language of Canada.

External links
 Official website

Sources

 Map of Kelsey R.M. at Statcan
 Manitoba Municipalities: Rural Municipality of Kelsey

Kelsey